Shirley Kellogg (born 27 May 1887 in Minneapolis, Minnesota) was an American actress and singer who found greater success in Britain than in America, mostly in revue.

Early life
She was born on 27 May 1887 in Minneapolis, Minnesota.

Career

She appeared in theatre, particularly at the London Hippodrome and married theatrical and later film director Albert de Courville in June 1913. In 1917 she was filmed promoting the introduction of the motor scooter to England. From 1921 to 1924 she owned Little Grove, a Georgian house in East Barnet which she was said to have spent £10,000 restoring, a very large amount of money at that time. The house was known as Shirley Grove during her ownership.

In 1924, Kellogg was granted a divorce from de Courville.

In 1924, Kellogg travelled to Hollywood to attempt to break into moving pictures and featured in silent films.

Appearances
Ziegfeld Follies of 1910. 
Hullo Ragtime! London Hippodrome, 1912.
Are You There? The Prince of Wales's Theatre, London, 1913.
Hullo Tango! 1913.
Push and Go, London Hippodrome, 1915.
Zig-Zag! London Hippodrome, 1917.
Cheating Cheaters, Strand Theatre, 1918
Joy Bells, London Hippodrome, 1919.
Also Toured with Eric Randolph in Venus Ltd

References 

See also 6 Family Trees on Ancestry.com Wilbur-Kendall,Crispin-Wilbur,Trueba,Anderson-Ford-Wodniza,Holt-Hodges and Kuehn-Kong2018_11_05 where her proper name is given as Clara Schmitz b 27 May 1887 Minneapolis d Feb 1962 Loma Vista,California.

External links 

footlightnotes.wordpress.com
npg.org.uk
YouTube
i1.wp.com
New York Times

1880s births
Year of death missing
East Barnet
American actresses
American women singers
American expatriate actresses in the United Kingdom